En t'attendant is the debut studio album by the French actress and singer Mélanie Laurent, released on 2 May 2011 on Atmosphériques. Produced by Joel Shearer, it contains twelve songs, five of which are co-written and co-produced with the Irish folk musician Damien Rice.

Track listing

Chart positions

Singles

References

2011 debut albums